Statistics of Lao League in the 2008 season.

Overview
Lao Army FC won the championship.

References
RSSSF

Lao Premier League seasons
1
Laos
Laos